John Edward Cashman (1865–1946) was a politician in Wisconsin.

Cashman was born in Franklin, Kewaunee County, Wisconsin. He attended Valparaiso University and the University of Chicago Law School.

Career
Cashman was a member of the Wisconsin State Senate from 1923 to 1938 and again from 1941 to 1946. He was also a delegate to the 1924 Republican National Convention. Cashman was twice a Democratic candidate for the United States House of Representatives from Wisconsin's 8th congressional district, losing to incumbent George J. Schneider in 1936 and to Joshua L. Johns in 1938. He was also affiliated with the Wisconsin Progressive Party.

He died in office in 1946.

References

People from Franklin, Kewaunee County, Wisconsin
Wisconsin state senators
Wisconsin Republicans
Wisconsin Democrats
Wisconsin Progressives (1924)
20th-century American politicians
Valparaiso University alumni
University of Chicago Law School alumni
1865 births
1946 deaths